Super Citizen Ko (Chao ji da guo min) is a 1995 Taiwanese drama film directed by Wan Jen. The film was selected as the Taiwanese entry for the Best Foreign Language Film at the 68th Academy Awards, but was not accepted as a nominee.

Cast
  as Chen Cheng-l
 Lin Yang as Ko L-Sheng
 Sean Su
 Ming-Ming Sue as Ko Hsu-Chin

See also
 List of submissions to the 68th Academy Awards for Best Foreign Language Film
 List of Taiwanese submissions for the Academy Award for Best Foreign Language Film

References

External links
 

1995 films
1995 drama films
Taiwanese drama films
Taiwanese-language films